The Distinguished Intelligence Medal is awarded by the U.S. Central Intelligence Agency for performance of outstanding services or for achievement of a distinctly exceptional nature in a duty or responsibility.

Recipients

This list includes only those publicly acknowledged to have received this award. Due to the nature of the clandestine services, an unknown number of additional individuals may have been awarded this medal in secret for actions on classified missions.

CIA medals are sometimes referred to as "jock strap medals" since they are often awarded secretly (due to the classification level of the respective operation) and cannot be displayed or, on occasion, acknowledged publicly.

See also
Awards and decorations of the United States government

References

External links 
 

Awards and decorations of the Central Intelligence Agency